Matti Paloheimo (born 4 December 1935 in Kainuu) is a sailor from Finland, who represented his country at the 1976 Summer Olympics in Kingston, Ontario, Canada as crew member in the Soling. With helmsman Matti Jokinen and fellow crew member Reijo Laine they took the 18th place.

References

Living people
1935 births
Sailors at the 1976 Summer Olympics – Soling
Olympic sailors of Finland
Finnish male sailors (sport)
Sportspeople from Kainuu
20th-century Finnish people